Sthulabhadra (297-198 BCE) was the founder of Svetambara Jain order during a 12-year famine in Maurya empire in third or fourth-century BC. He was a disciple of Bhadrabahu and Sambhutavijaya. His father was Sakatala, a minister in Nanda kingdom before the arrival of Chandragupta Maurya. When his brother became the chief minister of the kingdom, Sthulabhadra became a Jain monk. He is mentioned in the 12th-century Jain text by Hemachandra.

Life
Sthulabhadra was a son of the Dhana Nanda's minister Sakatala and brother of Shrikaya. He is traditionally dated in 297 to 198 BCE. He loved and lived with a royal dancer in Dhana Nanda's court named Rupkosa. He denied ministry after the death of his father and became a Jain monk. His brother became the chief minister in Nanda empire later. He became a disciple of Sambhutavijaya (347-257 BCE) and Bhadrabahu (322-243 BCE). He led an ascetic life for 12 years. He spent his chaturmas at Rupkosa's home, during which she tried to lure him away from ascetic life but failed. Sthulabhadra in turn gave her vows of a Shravika (Jain laywoman).

He is said to have learned the 14 purvas (pre-canons) from Bhadrabahu and is considered as last Shrut Kevali(all knower of Jain Scriptures) in Svetambara tradition, a claim which is rejected by Digambara tradition. He was succeeded by his disciples Mahagiri and Suhasti. Digambara texts state that Sthulabhadra permitted the use loincloth during the 12-year famine, a practice that started the Svetambara order. He is mentioned in the 12th-century Jain text by Hemachandra.

References

Citations

Sources
 
 
 

Jain acharyas
Place of birth unknown
297 BC births
198 BC deaths
Indian Jain monks
3rd-century BC Indian Jains
3rd-century BC Jain monks
3rd-century BC Indian monks
2nd-century BC Indian Jains
2nd-century BC Jain monks
2nd-century BC Indian monks
Śvētāmbara monks